Katie Swan was the defending champion but chose not to participate.

Zheng Qinwen won the title, defeating Christina McHale in the final, 6–0, 6–1.

Seeds

Draw

Finals

Top half

Bottom half

References

Main Draw

Orlando USTA Pro Circuit Event - Singles